Driven is a 1916 British silent drama film directed by Maurice Elvey and starring Elisabeth Risdon, Fred Groves and Guy Newall. The film is based on the play The Evolution of Katherine by E. Temple Thurston. After learning she hasn't long to live, a woman begins an affair.

Cast
 Elisabeth Risdon as Katherine Crichton  
 Fred Groves as John Staffurth  
 Guy Newall as Richard Furness  
 Henrietta Watson as Lady Crichton 
 Hugh Croise as Mr. Crichton

References

Bibliography
 Murphy, Robert. Directors in British and Irish Cinema: A Reference Companion. British Film Institute, 2006.

External links
 

1916 films
British drama films
British silent feature films
1910s English-language films
Films directed by Maurice Elvey
1916 drama films
British films based on plays
Films set in England
British black-and-white films
1910s British films
Silent drama films